Harm Reduction Journal is a peer-reviewed online-only medical journal covering harm reduction with respect to the use of psychoactive drugs. It was established in 2004 and is published by Springer Science+Business Media's BioMed Central imprint. It is affiliated with both Harm Reduction International and the Eurasian Harm Reduction Association. The editors-in-chief are Nick Crofts (University of Melbourne) and Euan Lawson (Lancaster University). According to the Journal Citation Reports, the journal has a 2020 impact factor of 4.362.

References

External links
 

Addiction medicine journals
BioMed Central academic journals
Online-only journals
Publications established in 2004
English-language journals